Old St. John's Church was a historic church at 600 W. Broad Street in Elyria, Ohio.

It was built in 1889 and added to the National Register of Historic Places in 1979.  It was delisted in 2016.

References

Churches in Elyria, Ohio
Properties of religious function on the National Register of Historic Places in Ohio
Gothic Revival church buildings in Ohio
Churches completed in 1889
Churches in Lorain County, Ohio
National Register of Historic Places in Lorain County, Ohio
Former National Register of Historic Places in Ohio